Soldier is the fourth studio album by American rock singer Iggy Pop. It was released in February 1980 by record label Arista.

Recording 

For the album Iggy collaborated with ex-Sex Pistols bassist Glen Matlock.

Ex-member of The Stooges James Williamson was originally hired to produce the album, but a conflict between Williamson and David Bowie (who was assisting as a friend of Pop) over recording techniques led to Williamson walking out on the project.

Bowie and Simple Minds provide backing vocals on "Play It Safe".

There has been some debate over the lack of lead guitar on the final mix, which has been criticized by Glen Matlock. In Pop's biography, Matlock claims that the lead guitar was stripped after Bowie was punched by Stella Nova for hitting on her girlfriend of that time, Patti Palladin.

Release 

Soldier was released in February 1980 by record label Arista. The album peaked at number 125 on the Billboard charts. Videos were made for the songs "Loco Mosquito", "Knocking 'Em Down (In the City)" and "Dog Food".

Critical reception 

Soldier has received a mixed-to-favorable reception from critics.

In her retrospective review, Charlotte Robinson of PopMatters wrote "Instead of a punk masterpiece, [...] Soldier turned out to be an uneven and sometimes plain silly recording."

Rolling Stone's David Fricke reviewed the album positively, calling attention to Iggy Pop's successful weathering of his own self-destructive persona. Of the album, Fricke wrote: "Soldier, like all of his albums, is a hard-fought battle in a war that Iggy Pop is determined to win. Call him Ig noble."

Track listing

Alternate track listing 
Specific regions and the 1991 Arista CD reissue had the following alternate track order:

Personnel 

 Iggy Pop – vocals
 Glen Matlock – bass guitar, backing vocals
 Ivan Kral – guitar, keyboards
 Klaus Krüger – drums
 Stella Nova – guitar
 Barry Andrews – keyboards
with:
 Simple Minds (Jim Kerr and Derek Forbes) – backing vocals on "Play It Safe"
 David Bowie, Patti Palladin, Glen Matlock, Steve New, Ivan Kral, James Williamson – backing vocals on "Play It Safe"
 Henry McGroggan – chorus on "Loco Mosquito"

Technical
 Pat Moran – production
 Thom Panunzio – mixing, production on "Low Life"
 Peter Haden – engineering
 Joe Brescio – mastering
 Brian Griffin/Rocking Russian – sleeve design

Charts

References 

Trynka, P. (2007). Iggy Pop: Open Up and Bleed. New York: Broadway Books.

External links 

 

1980 albums
Iggy Pop albums
Arista Records albums
Albums produced by Pat Moran
Albums recorded at Rockfield Studios